Great Ponton railway station was a station on the East Coast Main Line at Great Ponton, Lincolnshire, England. The Great Northern Railway opened it in 1853 and British Railways closed it in 1958. The station buildings were demolished soon after the closure.

Quarry link
The Park Gate Iron and Steel Company had an ironstone quarry east of Sproxton, Leicestershire. A 1917 Manning Wardle steam locomotive that worked the line is preserved on the Kent and East Sussex Railway.

References

Disused railway stations in Lincolnshire
Railway stations in Great Britain closed in 1958
Railway stations in Great Britain opened in 1853
Former Great Northern Railway stations